Sheila Larken (born February 24, 1944) is an American television actress, best known for playing the role of Margaret Scully, the mother of Dana Scully, on The X-Files.

Early life and career
Larken was born in Brooklyn, New York City and has appeared in such notable television series as Bonanza, Gunsmoke, Medical Center, Marcus Welby, M.D., Cagney & Lacey, Hawaii Five-O, It Takes a Thief, Barnaby Jones, Starsky and Hutch, Trapper John, M.D., Little House on the Prairie, Rawhide, The Incredible Hulk, Dallas , L.A. Law  and Cannon. She also appeared in "No Way Out," the final episode of the 1977 anthology series Quinn Martin's Tales of the Unexpected (known in the United Kingdom as Twist in the Tale). Her made-for-television movies include Attack on Terror: The FBI vs. the Ku Klux Klan (1975), Cave-In! (1983) and The Midnight Hour (1985).

Personal life

Larken lives in Bellingham, Washington with her husband, television producer R.W. Goodwin.

References

External links
 

1944 births
American television actresses
Living people
People from Bellingham, Washington
People from Brooklyn
21st-century American women